Iskay Rumi (Quechua iskay two, rumi stone, "two stones", also spelled Iskhay Rumi) is a  mountain in the Andes of Bolivia. Iskay Rumi lies northwest of the mining town of Santa Bárbara.

References 

Mountains of Potosí Department